Ajmer Singh may refer to:

 Ajmer Singh (athlete) (1940–2010), Indian sprinter
 Ajmer Singh Aulakh (1942–2017), Punjabi playwright
 Ajmer Singh (author) (born 1948), Sikh intellectual and writer
 Ajmer Singh (basketball) (born 1953), Indian basketball player